Edgewater is the name of some places in the U.S. state of Florida:
Edgewater, Broward County, Florida
Edgewater, Volusia County, Florida
Edgewater (Miami), a neighborhood within the City of Miami

it:Edgewater#Toponimi
nl:Edgewater (Florida)